The 25th Infantry Brigade "György Klapka", is a brigade-sized formation of the Hungarian Defence Forces.

History 
The brigade has been restructured several times since its inception more than six decades ago. The predecessor of the brigade was the 17th Heavy tank and Assault Gun Regiment. The formation of this regiment began in October 1950, and then the actual training of the troops began in November in Székesfehérvár. It was deployed to Baj in 1953, when it was renamed the 31st Heavy Tank and Assault Gun Regiment. In 1957, the regiment was moved to its current location, Tata. 

In 1961, the T-34 tanks were replaced by T-34 M type, then in 1962, for the first time in the Hungarian People's Army, the unit was equipped with T-55 type tanks. In 1978, another technical change ensued, when the T-72s were deployed with the regiment. In 1987 the regiment was transformed into the 25th Tank Brigade in 1987, and after the restructuring, the brigade was given the name "György Klapka". In 1997, the name was changed to the 25th György Klapka Mechanized Rifle Brigade. The brigade's name remained the same until May 2004, when it took the name of the 25th György Klapka Light Infantry Brigade, and then the Light Mixed Regiment of Szolnok became a sub unit of the brigade. This subunit was part of the brigade up until March 30, 2015, when it became and independent regiment called 24th Reconnaissance Regiment "Gergely Bornemissza".

During the reorganization of the Hungarian Defence Forces the unit has been renamed to 25th György Klapka Infantry Brigade on March 1, 2007.

With the Zrínyi 2026 military modernization program, several new types of vehicles and equipment has been delivered to the 25th Infantry Brigade, with even more on the way as of 2021. 12 Leopard 2A4HU has been delivered to serve as a training platform for the incoming Leopard 2A7+ vehicles. On February 9, 2021, 10 Gidrán vehicles has been delivered to the Brigade to supplement the 36th Anti-tank Missile Battalion.

Structure

Inventory 
 Infantry weapons
 AK-63
 CZ Bren 2
 PKM
 SVD
 RPG-7
 Vehicles
 T-72 - Used by the 11th Tank Battalion.
 BTR-80 - Used by both infantry battalions.
 BRDM-2 - Used by the 36th Anti-tank Battalion as a platform for anti-tank rockets.
 D-20 - Used by the 101st Artillery Battalion.
 Leopard 2A4HU - Used as a training platform.
 Leopard 2A7+ - Not yet delivered. Future main battle tank of both the brigade and the Hungarian Defence Forces
 PzH 2000 - Not yet delivered.
 Gidran (4x4 armored vehicle) - 10 delivered on February 9, 2021.

References 

Military units and formations of Hungary